A number of ships of the Royal Navy have borne the name HMS Dee, after one or other of the British rivers called the Dee.
 , a  sixth-rate frigate (or corvette) built by Jabez Bayley in Ipswich, launched in May 1814, commissioned at Sheerness in October 1814, and sold in July 1819.
 HMS Dee was to have been a  flush-decked brig (or brig-sloop) ordered from Woolwich dockyard in March 1823, and re-ordered as a paddle-steamer in May 1824.
 , a paddle steamer built by Woolwich dockyard, launched in May 1832, that served until June 1871, and broken up at Sheerness in October 1871.
 , a  flatiron gunboat built by Palmer, launched in April 1877, and sold in 1902.
 , a  built by Palmer, launched in September 1903, completed in May 1903, and sold in 1919.
, a  patrol boat launched in 1955 was renamed HMS Dee whilst serving as the training tender to the Mersey Division of the Royal Naval Reserve.

Notes

References
 Roger Chesneau, Conway's All the World's Fighting Ships 1906–1921,  published Conway Maritime Press, 1985.  
 Robert Gardiner, Conway's All the World's Fighting Ships 1860–1905,  published Conway Maritime Press, 1979.  
 David Lyon and Rif Winfield, The Sail & Steam Navy List, all the ships of the Royal Navy 1815-1889, pub Chatham Publishing, 2003, 
 Rif Winfield, British Warships in the Age of Sail 1793-1817, pub Chatham Publishing, 2005, 
 Rif Winfield, British Warships in the Age of Sail 1817-1863: Design, Construction, Careers & Fates, pub Seaforth Publishing, 2014, 

Royal Navy ship names